Epilepsy Outlook is a charity based in Hartlepool which provides free and confidential practical support, advice and information for people with epilepsy and their carers.
Their support services include supported volunteer placements, a drop-in centre, epilepsy awareness training, an art therapy group and welfare benefits advice. Each year it provides placements for 50 volunteers on the volunteer development programme, 280 people receive advice, including at least 100 carers. 50 plus people receive epilepsy awareness training. Six people use their drop-in each week. The services are provided for people across the North-East area. In September–October 2014, Epilepsy Outlook's headquarters, advice centre and art club moved around the corner to larger premises in The Arches, Park Road.

Charity shops
Epilepsy Outlook runs three charity shops where they sell donated items:

199 York Road, Hartlepool. Opening Times - Mon-Fri 9am-4pm & Sat 9am-1pm
104 Oxford Road, Hartlepool. Opening Times - Mon-Fri 9am-4pm & Sat 9am-1pm
79 Park Road, The Arches, Hartlepool. Opening Times - Mon-Fri 10am-4pm

Campaigns
As well as their charity shops and advice centre they run special fund raising campaigns including, most recently, for a sensory room for Callum Smith. By September 5, 2013, the total stood at £10,184 and raised a total of £14,000. Three McDonald's restaurants got involved with the campaign, raising £2,289, and Hartlepool's High Tunstall College of Science donated over £5,000 worth of sensory equipment including multi-coloured fibre optic lights, bubble machines and specialist chairs.

Before that they ran a campaign for a tumble form chair for two-year-old Talia Foster.

Structure
The charity is structured into volunteers, a management committee and trustees.
The management committee includes a Chairperson, Secretary, Treasurer and Operations manager.
The trustees include a medical trustee, business advice trustees, voluntary sector advice trustees and a legal trustee.

References

Charities based in County Durham
Epilepsy organizations
Health charities in the United Kingdom
Organisations based in the Borough of Hartlepool
Organizations established in 1987
Disability organisations based in the United Kingdom